WC4 may refer to:
 Wing Commander IV: The Price of Freedom
 WC4 asteroid 
 1994 WC4, see 9083 Ramboehm
 WC4 star spectral type, see Wolf–Rayet star
 WC4, a parasport cycling classification, see C4 (classification)
 Dodge WC4, military light truck, see Dodge WC series
 World Conqueror 4, a mobile ww2 and cold war simulator.